Wuzhou, or Wu Prefecture, was a zhou (prefecture) in imperial China. It is in the  border area of what is now southern Ningxia and Gansu, China. It was abolished in 958 under Later Zhou.

Geography
The administrative region of Wuzhou in the Tang dynasty is in modern Zhangjiakou, Hebei. It probably includes these areas: 
Under the administration of Pingliang, Gansu:
Pingliang
Under the administration of Zhongwei, Ningxia:
Haiyuan County
Under the administration of Guyuan, Ningxia:
Guyuan
Xiji County
Jingyuan County
Longde County
Pengyang County

References
 

Prefectures of the Tang dynasty
Prefectures of Later Tang
Prefectures of Later Jin (Five Dynasties)
Prefectures of Later Han (Five Dynasties)
Prefectures of Later Zhou
Former prefectures in Ningxia
Former prefectures in Gansu
Prefectures of Qi (Five Dynasties)